Bruce Behruz Fardanesh from the New York Power Authority (NYPA) in White Plains, NY was named Fellow of the Institute of Electrical and Electronics Engineers (IEEE) in 2013 for contributions to phasor measurement technology and flexible AC transmission systems.

References 

Fellow Members of the IEEE
Living people
Engineers from New York (state)
Year of birth missing (living people)
American electrical engineers